Torrebelvicino is a town in the province of Vicenza, Veneto, Italy. SP46 goes through the town, which is included in the Val Leogra, a valley in the Vicentine Prealps.

References

Cities and towns in Veneto